Meze Audio (also referred to as Meze or Meze Headphones) is a high-end audio company based in Baia Mare, Romania. Its product range consists of audiophile headphones and earphones.

Meze Headphones was founded by industrial designer Antonio Meze in 2011, in Baia Mare, Romania. Meze Headphones later changed its name to Meze Audio.

History

The idea of developing headphones started in 2009, in a time when the founder, Antonio Meze, was traveling extensively while working as an industrial designer for different agencies or manufacturing companies. Passionate about music and design, he was looking for a pair of headphones to accompany his travels, that he could relate to in the same way he did to his Fender Stratocaster guitar.

That's what drove Antonio to start experimenting with parts already on the market and acquiring knowledge about headphones, using wood to craft the speaker enclosure cups, a departure from the standard plastics and polymers commonly used until then.

In 2011, Antonio created Meze Headphones (later renamed as Meze Audio), in his hometown of Baia Mare, a city in the North West part of Romania. 
                                                                         
The breakthrough came in 2015, when the Meze 99 Classics were launched following an Indiegogo campaign. These have been the first headphones Meze Audio has developed in house, from the ground up, receiving multiple awards and nominations. The success of the 99 Classics was what helped Meze Audio initially build a name for themselves on the audiophile market.
The next years came with new product releases for Meze Audio. In 2016 they launched their first earphones: 12 Classics and 11 Neo, and in 2017 they released the Meze 99 Neo headphones, to complete the Classics product range. Later on, in 2021, the 12 Classics V2, an upgraded version of the 12 Classics, featuring a new design, was launched.

The moment that has put Meze Audio on the map in the audiophile market came a year later, when the company decided to take a chance on developing a headphone which appeals to a higher, more exigent category of audiophiles. In 2018 Meze Audio has partnered up with Rinaro Isodynamics, a company from Ukraine, which has been at the forefront of planar magnetic development since the 1980s. Combining Meze's aesthetic and user-centered design approach and Rinaro's experience in research and development within the field of planar magnetic drivers, the Empyrean headphones were born and established Meze Audio's position on the high-end audio market. 

Soon after the Empyrean, Meze Audio created their first flagship In-ear monitor, Rai Penta, with 2 x dual BA's and 1 Dynamic driver. To complete the RAI product range, Rai Solo came out end of 2019, as an IEM option for entry-level audiophiles.

Together with Rinaro, the company has created two more products using variations of the same highly acclaimed Isodynamic Hybrid Array technology used in Empyrean - ELITE, a headphone featuring the same design as Empyrean, which uses different materials for the driver to create a distinct sound, and LIRIC, the first closed-back headphone powered by the Isodynamic Hybrid Array driver from Rinaro, reengineered for portable use. Both products were launched in 2021.

Also in 2021, Meze Audio introduced their Art Gallery collection with the launch of Empyrean Phoenix, a rare collector's item that celebrates the union of art and high-end audio technology.

Meze Audio headphones are currently being sold worldwide, online and through retail stores.

Products

References

Headphones manufacturers
Audio equipment manufacturers of Romania
Companies established in 2011
Romanian brands
Companies of Maramureș County
Baia Mare

External links